The Presidio of San Ignacio de Túbac or Fort Tubac was a Spanish built fortress. The fortification was established by the Spanish Army in 1752 at the site of present-day Tubac, Arizona. Its ruins are preserved in the Tubac Presidio State Historic Park.

History

Spanish Period
The presidio housed a garrison of about fifty cavalry and or infantry soldiers and was intended to protect Spanish settlements and missions in the valley of the Santa Cruz River. In 1766, the garrison had 51 officers and men, and a settlement of forty families had grown up around the post. In 1774, Tubac's commander, Captain Juan Bautista de Anza, assembled the expedition that explored a land route from the Santa Cruz Valley to California.

A reorganization of frontier defenses in 1775 resulted in the transfer of the garrison. The force under Lieutenant Juan Fernandez Carmona was enlarged to fifty-six officers and men and received orders to proceed forty miles north to a site within present-day downtown Tucson, Arizona. There they constructed the Presidio San Augustin del Tucson in 1775 under the orders of Captain Hugh O'Conor. Eventually a new garrison formed in the Tubac presidio, which campaigned against the Apaches for decades until the Mexican War of Independence.

In 1775 and 1776, de Anza escorted 240 colonists from San Miguel de Horcasitas (in Sonora, Mexico), to Monterey, California. Leaving the colonists at Monterey, de Anza continued north as far as present-day San Francisco, where he selected sites for the mission and presidio.

By the early years of the 19th century, Tubac's garrison continued to protect the area from raids by Apache Indians. In 1804, the post had two officers, two sergeants and eighty-four men. There were also eight families of Spanish settlers and 20 Indian families living within the presidio land allotment of five square miles. The garrison community had 1,000 head of cattle, 5,000 sheep, 600 horses, 200 mules, and 15 burros and 300 goats, and had an annual harvest of 1,000 bushels of wheat and 600 bushels of corn.

Mexican Period
Following the independence of Mexico from Spain in 1821, the presidio was abandoned and the settlement was in ruins when settlers from the United States reached the Santa Cruz Valley in the late 1840s, no official garrison manned the fortress and it remained abandoned along with the settlement for most of the Mexican period. For a short while in 1846 during the Mexican–American War, Tubac was home to a large company of Mexican troops, over 200 men. The Mexicans had retreated from Fort Tucson just before the American Mormon Battalion captured it. After the war Tubac was abandoned until Americans traveling for the California Gold Rush decided to settle there instead.

American Period

Tubac officially became an American settlement in 1853 after the Gadsden Purchase. At this time Tubac was home to several dozen people and was a company town for the mining company of Charles D. Poston. The post was manned by a small team of militia and was attacked repeatedly by Apaches in the eighteenth century. The last attack was the Siege of Tubac in 1861. American militia and civilians were besieged in the fort until rescued by the Confederate States militia under Captain Granville H. Oury of Fort Tucson. Tubac was abandoned again after the siege but reoccupied by the United States Army during and after the American Civil War for several years.
The main two original presidio buildings remained intact after the turn to the 20th century and are now tourist attractions. The presidio of Tubac was resettled in the 1880s and by the 1886 surrender of Geronimo, the Apache were no longer a threat to settlers in that part of Arizona. The fort was from that point not of military value in terms of strategic location.

References
The information in this summary was taken from
 Max Moorehead, Presidio, University of Oklahoma Press, 1975
 Rex E. Gerald, Spanish Presidios of the Late Eighteenth Century in Northern New Spain, University of New Mexico Press, 1968 
 Report of Manuel de Leon, Ensign of the Presidio at Tubac, August 1, 1804, translated by Fr. Kieran McCarty, OFM, in Desert Documentary, Arizona Historical Society Monograph No. 4, 1976.

San Ignacio
1752 establishments in New Spain
National Register of Historic Places in Santa Cruz County, Arizona
Forts on the National Register of Historic Places in Arizona